William E. Bush (April 2, 1936 – August 14, 2001) was an American politician who served in the New York State Assembly from 1977 to 1990.

He died on August 14, 2001, in Syracuse, New York at age 65.

References

1936 births
2001 deaths
Republican Party members of the New York State Assembly
20th-century American politicians